Nyron Dyer (born 24 October 1989) is a Montserratian international footballer who plays as a defender.

Career
Dyer made his international debut for Montserrat in 2011, and has appeared in FIFA World Cup qualifying matches. He also competed at the 2012 Caribbean Championship.

References

1989 births
Living people
Montserratian footballers
Montserrat international footballers
Association football defenders